Haley & Michaels is an American country music duo composed of Shannon Haley and Ryan Michaels, both born in California. They released an extended play, Haley & Michaels, independently on October 21, 2014, and a full album Hail Mary on November 15, 2019 under the label Hickory Records.

Career
Shannon Haley and Ryan Michaels met in January 2011, introduced by friends at a coffee shop in Nashville, Tennessee. They married on May 9, 2015 in Saratoga, California. In March 2020, they announced expecting their first child a daughter in early October.

They released their debut single, "Just Another Love Song", in April 2014. They co-wrote the song with Richie McDonald of Lonestar; the song itself references that band's 1999 hit "Amazed", and features McDonald singing that song's chorus. It peaked at number 59 on the Billboard Country Airplay chart in January 2015.

In January 2018, the duo were signed to Hickory Records.  Their first single released under the label was "All Out".

in 2019, their song "Hail Mary" was used as the anthem for the 2019 season by the San Francisco 49ers. It was also featured in the Netflix film Walk. Ride. Rodeo. They released their first full album, Hail Mary, in November 2019.

Discography

Albums

Extended plays

Singles

Music videos

References

External links

American country music groups
American musical duos
Country music duos
Musical groups established in 2011
Musical groups from Nashville, Tennessee